In enzymology, a 2-aminohexanoate transaminase is an enzyme that catalyzes the chemical reaction

L-2-aminohexanoate + 2-oxoglutarate  2-oxohexanoate + L-glutamate

Thus, the two substrates of this enzyme are L-2-aminohexanoate and 2-oxoglutarate, whereas its two products are 2-oxohexanoate and L-glutamate.

This enzyme belongs to the family of transferases, specifically the transaminases, which transfer nitrogenous groups.  The systematic name of this enzyme class is L-2-aminohexanoate:2-oxoglutarate aminotransferase. Other names in common use include norleucine transaminase, norleucine (leucine) aminotransferase, and leucine L-norleucine: 2-oxoglutarate aminotransferase.  It employs one cofactor, pyridoxal phosphate.

References

 

EC 2.6.1
Pyridoxal phosphate enzymes
Enzymes of unknown structure